is Japanese painter, color designer, producer, and the current president of Shaft.

Career
Kubota began his career in the anime industry as a cel painter for the 1981 film Furiten-kun as a sub-contractor with painting studio Shaft, which had been founded in 1975 by Hiroshi Wakao. The next year, he debuted as a color designer Hitotsuboshi-ke no Ultra Baasan (1982–1983). From then until 1995, Kubota mainly served as a cel painter, color specifier, clean-up inspector, and clean-up artist In 1995, Kubota moved up to production management, which began with Shaft's first original series: Juuni Senshi Bakuretsu Eto Ranger. The year after, Kubota and Shaft were approached by Triangle Staff and Ryūtarō Nakamura to produce the second episode of their Legend of Crystania: The Chaos Ring OVA series, which the studio and Kubota accepted the offer to. In 2000, he started serving as a producer for Shaft's own series. In 2004, Shaft-founder Hiroshi Wakao retired as president of the company and Kubota was chosen to succeed him, with the former staying as a chairman with the studio.

After watching several Akiyuki Shinbo's works as a director, namely The SoulTaker and Le Portrait de Petit Cossette, Kubota invited the former to become a director and mentor with the studio for the purpose of creating a uniquely identifiable brand. Shinbo brought many talents to the studio, such as directors Shin Ōnuma, Tatsuya Oishi, Naoyuki Tatsuwa, and Tomoyuki Itamura, and the studio has since achieved fame for having "arthouse" productions and "striking" visuals throughout the studio's works. In the mid-2000s, following several instances of Triangle Staff and Nakmaura outsourcing episodes of their series to Shaft, Kubota asked Nakamura to direct REC at the studio, which Nakamura agreed to. During production of the series, Kubota was approached to produce a film version of Kino's Journey, which Nakamura had previously directed at Triangle Staff, to which Kubota and Shaft obliged their services.

Works

Television series

OVAs

ONAs

Films

Notes

References

External links

1977 births
Living people